Bailon or Bailón may refer to the following people:
Bailón Becerra (born 1966), Bolivian cyclist
Adrienne Bailon (born 1983), American singer-songwriter, recording artist, actress, dancer and television personality 
Aurélie Bailon (born 1987), French rugby union player 
Celestino Bailón Guerrero (born 1954), Mexican politician 
Jaime Bailón, Spanish Paralympic swimmer 
Joe Bailon (born 1923), American car customizer